The Men's 1500m freestyle event took place on 21 March 2006 at the Melbourne Sports and Aquatic Centre in Melbourne, Australia. The event was won by 21 year old Dave Davies of Wales in a time of 14:57.63. In doing so, Davies became the first Welsh swimming champion in 32 years. Andrew Hurd from Canada placed second with a time of 15:09.44, while South Africa's Hercules Prinsloo placed third with a time of 15:11.88.

Men's 1500 m Freestyle - Final

Men's 1500 m Freestyle - Heats

Men's 1500 m Freestyle - Heat 01

Men's 1500 m Freestyle - Heat 02

References 

 "Results and Medalists—2006 Commonwealth Games". Thecgf.com. Commonwealth Games Federation.
 "Official Website". M2006.thecgf.com. Melbourne 2006.

Swimming at the 2006 Commonwealth Games
Commonwealth Games in Australia
Sports competitions in Melbourne
March 2006 sports events in Australia